Kokalyane Point (‘Nos Kokalyane’ \'nos ko-'ka-lya-ne\) is the point on the west coast of Rugged Island in the South Shetland Islands, Antarctica forming the south side of the entrance to Bogomil Cove. Situated 810 m north-northwest of Benson Point, 970 m south of Ugain Point and 2.51 km south of Cape Sheffield.

The point is named after the settlement of Kokalyane in western Bulgaria.

Location

Maps
 Península Byers, Isla Livingston. Mapa topográfico a escala 1:25000. Madrid: Servicio Geográfico del Ejército, 1992.
 L.L. Ivanov. Antarctica: Livingston Island and Greenwich, Robert, Snow and Smith Islands. Scale 1:120000 topographic map.  Troyan: Manfred Wörner Foundation, 2009.  
 Antarctic Digital Database (ADD). Scale 1:250000 topographic map of Antarctica. Scientific Committee on Antarctic Research (SCAR). Since 1993, regularly upgraded and updated.
 L.L. Ivanov. Antarctica: Livingston Island and Smith Island. Scale 1:100000 topographic map. Manfred Wörner Foundation, 2017.

References
 Kokalyane Point. SCAR Composite Gazetteer of Antarctica
 Bulgarian Antarctic Gazetteer. Antarctic Place-names Commission. (details in Bulgarian, basic data in English)

External links
 Kokalyane Point. Copernix satellite image

Headlands of the South Shetland Islands
Bulgaria and the Antarctic